By the Way is an historic building in Greenhalgh-with-Thistleton, Lancashire, England. It is believed to date to the late 17th century, and has been designated a Grade II listed building by Historic England. The property is located on Fleetwood Road.

The building is a cottage in rendered brick with a thatched roof.  It has two storeys, the original part having two bays with lean-to extensions on the right and at the rear.  There is a later two-storey single-bay extension to the left.  Most of the windows are casements, with sliding sash windows in the upper floor, and all the windows have ornamental external shutters.

See also
Listed buildings in Greenhalgh-with-Thistleton

Notes

References

External links
A view of the property from Fleetwood Road in 2018 – Google Street View

Houses completed in the 17th century
Grade II listed buildings in Lancashire
Houses in Lancashire
Buildings and structures in the Borough of Fylde